This article is intended as a catalogue of dining and refreshment services and carriages used by the Victorian Railways and successors.

E type carriages

Long W type carriages

Pullman

S type carriages

Overland

Southern Aurora

N type carriages

XPT
XBR/XFR

Preservation
Buffet modules fitted to 80ABW, 5ABE

References

Peter J Vincent: BRS cars
Peter J Vincent: VFS cars
Peter J Vincent: MRS cars
Peter J Vincent: MBS cars
Peter J Vincent: VFR cars
Comrails
Victorianrailways.net

Victorian Railways carriages